Thakur Panchanan Mahila Mahavidyalaya is an undergraduate, women's college in Cooch Behar, West Bengal established in 1981. It offers Bachelor of Arts (B.A.) degree in Various subject. The college is affiliated to Cooch Behar Panchanan Barma University and accredited by NAAC as C+.

Thakur Panchanan Mahila Mahavidyalaya, also known as Mahila College Cooch Behar is a renowned center for propagation  of advance knowledge. The main building of the college on Magazin Road Extension, Cooch Behar near Rabindra Bhavan.

History

Thakur Panchanan Mahila Mahavidyalaya was established in September 1981 with the objective to spread advance education among the women of the surrounding area and at the same time make them self-sufficient. The college building was first built near the Rajbari or the Royal Palace of Cooch Behar.

Courses offered
B.A. Honours and Pass: 
English 
Bengali 
History 
Philosophy 
Political Science 
Economics 
Geography 
Sanskrit
Education

Instructors
At the end of June 2010, Malda College has the following permanent associate and assistant professors, and full-time contractual assistant professors:

 Department of Bengali: Gopa Majumder, Bibhuti Bhushan Biswas, Upendra nath Barman, Dr. Tapasi Sarkar, Chandrima Bhattacherjee
 Department of English: Mustafa Ahmed, Manashi Chakrobarty
 Department of History: Harish Chandra P,  Dasgupta.
 Department of Economics: Dr. Manjuri Biswas, Tapati Guha (Saha)
 Department of Philosophy: Sati Singh, Dr. Riki Chakraborty, Durba Mukherjee
 Department of Political Science: P T Lepcha, A Samajder, Munmun Das, Dr. Amaresh Kanti Sarkar
 Department of Geography: J Saha, B Biswas
 Department of Sanskrit: T Chakraborty

See also

References

External links
 http://tpmm.org.in

Colleges affiliated to Cooch Behar Panchanan Barma University
Academic institutions formerly affiliated with the University of North Bengal
Women's universities and colleges in West Bengal
Universities and colleges in Cooch Behar district
Educational institutions established in 1981
1981 establishments in West Bengal